A list of films produced in Brazil in 2006 (see 2006 in film):

2006

See also
2006 in Brazil
2006 in Brazilian television

2006
Films
Brazilian